Kitchener was a federal electoral district represented in the House of Commons of Canada from 1968 to 1997. It was located in the province of Ontario. This riding was created in 1966 from parts of Waterloo North and Waterloo South ridings.

It initially consisted of the City of Kitchener, Ontario.

In 1976, it was redefined to exclude the northeastern part of the city.

The electoral district was abolished in 1996 when it was redistributed between Kitchener Centre and Waterloo—Wellington ridings.

Members of Parliament

Election results

|}

|}

|}

|}

|}

|}

|}

|}

See also 

 List of Canadian federal electoral districts
 Past Canadian electoral districts

External links 
Riding history from the Library of Parliament

Former federal electoral districts of Ontario
Politics of Kitchener, Ontario